Cosmetic Executive Women (CEW) is a trade organization for the cosmetics, fragrance and personal care industry.

History
CEW was founded in 1954 as a social organization for female executives working in the beauty industry. In 1975, the group expanded, and began focusing on the recognition of the career achievements of women working in the industry. By 1985, CEW established itself as a professional network, offering seminars, speakers, and mentoring to aid its members in career development.

Organization
CEW's membership is now around 9,500, and includes women and men. CEW's members span entry-level to high-ranking executives of beauty companies or related businesses.

Its lineup of programming for its members includes career workshops, networking events, online mentoring, a beauty career center, speaker series, news forums and industry newsletters.

Award programs
CEW has become well known for its recognition programs. One, the Achiever Awards, are presented to individuals who have demonstrated "strong leadership" in the industry. Previous winners of this award include Linda Wells, the editor in chief of Allure magazine; Leslie Blodgett, CEO of mineral cosmetic company Bare Escentuals; Lisa Price, founder of African American hair care company Carol's Daughter; Gina Drosos, Global Head of Beauty at Procter & Gamble; and Alex Keith, an executive with P&G's beauty sector. CEW is also known for its Beauty Awards, where cosmetic, fragrance, skin care, hair care and body care products of various categories are judged for quality and innovation by CEW's members. After a selection of finalist products is announced, the final winning products (and companies) are honored at a gala event in New York City. Many influential cosmetic executives, journalists, and celebrities attend this event, and a CEW Beauty Award is widely recognized as the most prestigious honor a company can receive for its products.

Philanthropy
In 2001, the CEW Foundation began a program called "Cancer and Careers," designed to provide support, education, and inspiration to cancer patients and survivors who are beginning or developing careers, as well as supporting newly diagnosed members of the workforce. Cancer and Careers focuses on supporting those affected by cancer in any industry, not strictly the beauty industry. It is supported by donations from CEW members as well as corporate and individual sponsors.

The CEW Foundation is headed by Executive Director Rebecca V. Nellis, MPP, Chairwoman Heidi Manheimer, Surratt Beauty, President Carlotta Jacobson of CEW, and Treasurer Kim Kelleher, Conde Nast

References

External links

Lash Extensions

Cosmetic industry
Beauty trade associations
Trade associations based in the United States
Professional associations based in the United States
Professional associations for women
Women's occupational organizations
Women's organizations based in the United States
Organizations established in 1954
1954 establishments in the United States